Mwaro is a city located in central Burundi. It is the capital city of Mwaro Province.

Populated places in Burundi